Riidaja Nature Reserve is a nature reserve which is located in Valga County, Estonia.

The area of the nature reserve is 13 ha.

The protected area was founded in 2013 to protect valuable habitat types and threatened species in Riidaja village (former Põdrala Parish).

References

Nature reserves in Estonia
Geography of Valga County